Jargeau is a commune in the Loiret department in north-central France.

Geography

The town is located in the French natural region of the Loire Valley, the former province of Orleans and the urban area of Orleans. 
Its territory is included in the southern part of the Paris Basin and therefore has the basin's geological features.

The Loire flows along the north edge of town.
The river is mostly underground, which can cause circular bed collapses called Bîmes, making the sandy shores unstable. 
Like all cities located on the course of the Loire and in the southern Paris Basin, Jargeau is in middle Loire.
The Marmagne, a tributary of the Dhuy, runs through the southeastern area of the municipality.

Notable people

 Thomas Montacute, 4th Earl of Salisbury (1388-1428), English commander who participated in taking Jargeau during the Hundred Years War
 Drouet de Dammartin or Dreux de Dammartin (died 1413), French sculptor and architect, ended his life in Jargeau.
 Jean de Dammartin or Jehan de Dampmartin ( died 1453), French architect, born in Jargeau. The prime builder of the Le Mans Cathedral in 1421 and the Tours Cathedral in 1432

 Several figures are related to the Battle of Jargeau
 Joan of Arc (1412-1431) delivered the city from the English in 1429 and was assisted by her companions  Jean V de Bueil (1406-1477) André de Laval-Montmorency (1408-1486 ), Guy XIV de Laval (1406-1486), Gilles de Rais (1404-1440) nicknamed Bluebeard, Louis, Count of Vendôme (1376-1446), Ambroise de Loré (1395-1446). 
 On the other side, the mercenary Étienne de Vignolles (1390-1443) and Jean Poton de Xaintrailles (circa 1390-1461 ) also participated in the battle. Jean de Dunois (1402-1468) joined the company of which he was captain to those of Jean II, Duke of Alençon, and commanded at the Battle of Jargeau. Captain William de la Pole, Duke of Suffolk (1396-1450) led the British troops occupying Jargeau.
 King Louis XI of France (1423-1483) signed the marriage contract of his eldest daughter Anne (1461-1522) and Pierre de Beaujeu (1438-1503) in 1473 at Jargeau.
 Albert Viger (1843-1926), French politician, was born in Jargeau, MP and senator of Loiret, Minister of Agriculture under the Third Republic., commandeur de la Légion d'honneur
 Louis-Oscar Roty (1846-1911), French designer of coins and stamps, medal engraver. The museum and the Oscar Roty Foundation are located in Jargeau.
 Jeanne Chauvin (1862–1926), the second woman to obtain a degree in law in France, and the second French woman to be authorized to plead at the bar, in 1900.
 Octave Denis Victor Guillonnet (1872 - 1967), French painter, spent his childhood in the town.
 Charles Genty (1876 - 1956), cartoonist, illustrator and painter, was born in Jargeau.
 Michel Regnier, Québécois director, cinematographer, editor and writer was born in Jargeau in 1934.
 Élisabeth Lerminier, French journalist was born Jargeau in 1947.

Twin towns
The town is twinned with:
  Corsham 
  Reilingen

See also
 Communes of the Loiret department

References

External links

 Jargeau website

Communes of Loiret